David McFadden may refer to:

David McFadden (poet) (1940–2018), Canadian poet, novelist and travel writer
David Henry McFadden (1856–1935), Manitoba politician
David James McFadden (born 1945), Ontario lawyer, former politician
David Revere McFadden, American museum curator
David McFadden (reporter),  Associated Press reporter based in Kingston, Jamaica

See also
David McFadzean, American TV producer